Crna dama is the second studio album by the Serbian band Smak, released in 1977.

Track listing

Personnel 
Smak
 Boris Aranđelović — vocals
 Radomir Mihajlović "Točak" — guitar
 Miodrag Petkovski "Miki" — keyboards
 Zoran Milanović — bass guitar
 Slobodan Stojanović "Kepa" — drums, percussion

Additional personnel
 Harmonium Quartet — strings
 Ben Kennard — cello
 Brian Mack — viola
 Pat Nalling — first violin
 John Knight — second violin
 Perry Morgan — engineer
 Harry Fisher — mastered By
 Maurice Pert — percussion
 Dragan S. Stefanović — photography, artwork, design
 Martin Levan — production
 Dave Harris — recording engineer
 Nigel Green — assistant recording engineer

References

External links

Smak albums
1977 albums
Serbian-language albums
PGP-RTB albums